Lithuanian Mint is the state-owned enterprise, responsible for the mintage of coins and decorations of Lithuania. The shareholding is managed by the central bank of Lithuania. Lithuanian mintage tradition traces its history back to Algirdas times, when in Vilnius, capital city of Lithuania, was established Vilnius Mint. The mint was chosen to create the Lithuanian euro coins upon the country entering the Eurozone in 2015.

External links
Official website

Government-owned companies of Lithuania
Mints (currency)